Antonio Strati (born 1949) is an Italian organizational theorist, artist and Professor at the University of Trento, particularly known for his work on "Organization and aesthetics".

Biography 
Born in Reggio Calabria, Italy, Strati attended secondary education in Florence. He received his BA in Sociology in 1974 from the University of Trento. In 1982 he received his PhD in Organization Studies in 1982 from the Tavistock Institute in London, where he specialized in Action Research.

After his graduation he started at the University of Trento, where he was coordinated the teaching programme on qualitative methods in social research. He also directed the master's degree in Work, Organization and Information, and was vice-dean of the Faculty of Sociology. Eventually he was appointed Full professor at the Faculty of Sociology of the University of Trento. Strati also lectured "A Photographic Look at Work and Organization" at Sciences Po in Paris.

Selected publications 
Books:
 Strati, Antonio. Organization and aesthetics. Sage, 1999.
 Strati, Antonio. Theory and method in organization studies: paradigms and choices. Sage, 2000.

Articles, a selection:
 Strati, Antonio. "Aesthetic understanding of organizational life." Academy of Management Review 17.3 (1992): 568–581.
 Strati, Antonio. "La grounded theory." in: L. Ricolfi (ed,). La ricerca qualitativa, La Nuova Italia Scientifica, Roma (1997).
 Strati, Antonio. "The aesthetic approach in organization studies." The aesthetics of organization (2000): 13–34.

References

External links 
 UNITN, Antonio Strati

1949 births
Living people
Italian artists
Italian business theorists
University of Trento alumni
Academic staff of the University of Trento
Academic staff of Sciences Po
People from Reggio Calabria